Tabriz Cable Bridge, officially calls Ettehad-e-Melli (National Unity), is a cable-stayed bridge flanked by 29 Bahman Metro Station at the eastern entrance of Tabriz, capital of East Azerbaijan province, Iran. It is the biggest cable-stayed bridge in Iran with a total length of 113 meters and width of 32 meters.

References

External links
 Tabriz Cable Bridge in night

Bridges completed in 2007
Cable-stayed bridges in Iran
Buildings and structures in Tabriz
Transport in Tabriz